Winston Walter Frederick Percy (born 28 September 1943, near Tolpuddle, Dorset) is a former motor racing driver from England. Percy was British Touring Car Champion three times, and at the time of his retirement was the most successful non-Antipodean driver ever to compete in Australia's premier national motorsport event, the Bathurst 1000km. Joe Saward of Autosport magazine said he was "often regarded as the World's Number One Touring Car Driver".

Early years
Percy found his way into motor sport through his first employment as a motor mechanic at his local garage. His first race was in 1964, in a local time-trial event driving his own road-going Ford Anglia 1200. He won, beating drivers of far more powerful cars in the process. While he initially pursued competitive driving as a hobby, his innate talent quickly resulted in many high-placed finishes in national-level races, including taking all three victories in the 1973 televised rallycross races at Cadwell Park. On the back of these results he turned professional in 1974, driving Spike Andersons Samuri Datsun 240Z in the British Modified Sports Car Championship. Once again, he won.

British Touring Car Championship
The following year saw Percy enter the British Touring Car Championship for the first time, a race series that he would come to dominate in the years ahead. His first race in the BTCC would also be the first time he encountered Tom Walkinshaw, after Percy won his class driving a Toyota, and also attacked Walkinshaw's Ford Escort in the class above. In 1983, Percy won the Willhire 24 Hour in a Porsche 928S.

He stuck with Toyota for the next four years, until Walkinshaw offered Percy a drive in his Tom Walkinshaw Racing-run Mazda RX-7 for the 1980 season. Percy won the 1980 Championship for TWR, and then went on to repeat the feat in the following year. Owing to a misunderstanding of Walkinshaw's off-beat sense of humour, Percy agreed to move back to Toyota for 1982. He once again won the BTCC crown for the 1982 season in the Toyota Corolla.

European and World Touring Car Championships

Despite remaining with Toyota during the 1983 BTCC season, Percy maintained his links to TWR with occasional drives in their V12 powered Jaguar XJS coupé which was proving the car to beat in Group A racing, and Walkinshaw managed to tempt him back full-time in 1984. However, rather than a return to the BTCC, TWR entered three of the big Jaguars in the European Touring Car Championship with Percy co-driving the lead car with Walkinshaw. The team won the 1984 ETCC with Walkinshaw also taking the drivers' title while the Walkinshaw, Percy and Hans Heyer Jaguar won the ETCC's blue riband event, the Spa 24 Hours. The following year after Jaguar shelved its touring car program to concentrate on racing Sportscars which saw TWR switch to works-backed Rover Vitesse V8s, again competing for the ETCC title. Walkinshaw and Percy this time took joint third in the drivers' championship. Along the way they scored victories in seven of the 500 km rounds: Donington; Silverstone; Monza; Vallelunga; Nogaro; the Österreichring; and Salzburg. 1985 also saw the Walkinshaw-Percy partnership in Australia for the first time, in an XJS, for the 1985 Bathurst 1000 where they finished third (the team's third car driven by Australia's John Goss and West German Armin Hahne won the race).

Once again, the TWR Vitesse cars were entered for the ETCC in 1986 where Percy finished 2nd in the Drivers' Championship. He had been declared the champion until a month after the championship, when the FIA belatedly applied a rule that each driver's lowest scoring result would be dropped. This gave the championship to BMW driver Roberto Ravaglia. However, 1986 also saw TWR running Jaguar's works Group C1 entry for the 24 Hours of Le Mans race; Percy was given one of the driving slots. His Jaguar XJR-6 lasted for 10 of the 24 hours, partnered by Gianfranco Brancatelli and Hurley Haywood at the wheel, before a drive-shaft failure dropped the car out of the race from second place. The wreckage finally came to a halt 600 metres down the road but, despite almost obliterating the vehicle, Percy walked away from the crash with nothing more than a badly battered helmet.

With TWR not racing in the 1987 World Touring Car Championship, Percy only drove selected rounds of the series as a driver for hire. This saw him team with fellow Englishman Andy Rouse in a turbo Ford Sierra as well as Australian team Roadways Racing driving a V8 Holden Commodore with Allan Grice, though in his five WTCC races Percy failed to finish each time.

Percy contested the 1988 European Touring Car Championship driving a factory backed Nissan Skyline HR31 GTS-R with Allan Grice. The pair, along with Sweden's Anders Olofsson finished 6th in the Spa 24 Hours. In October, Percy and Grice again drove a Roadways Racing Holden VL Commodore SS Group A SV in the Bathurst 1000, though electrical trouble through the race saw them finish in 15th place.

He continued to race in national and international competitions with a variety of teams until the end of the decade, winning the 1989 Spa 24 Hours race in an Eggenberger Motorsport Ford Sierra RS500.

Australia

Percy co-drove in the Australasian rounds of the 1987 World Touring Car Championship with Allan Grice in a Holden Commodore VL, and again at the 1988 Bathurst 1000. In 1989, he contested the Australian endurance races with Perkins Engineering under the Holden Racing Team name.

In 1990, at the behest of Holden Special Vehicles owner Tom Walkinshaw, Percy officially formed the works Holden Racing Team to contest the Australian Touring Car Championship. Racing on the largely unfamiliar Australian race tracks, Percy as both team manager and lead driver put in a strong showing against the faster and lighter Ford Sierra RS500s and Nissan Skyline turbos to be the highest placed Commodore driver, finishing 8th in the series with a best finish being 3rd in at the Lakeside round. This was despite being forced to miss Round 6 of the series at Mallala when he and his wife returned to England following the death of their son in a car accident.

Percy and Allan Grice were surprise winners of the 1990 Bathurst 1000 in a Holden VL Commodore SS Group A SV, before finished second in 1991 driving the newer Holden VN Commodore SS Group A SV. As a team manager and lead driver, Percy would claim that his hardest decision was to let Grice drive the final stint of the 1990 Bathurst 1000. Percy, who had injured his shoulder a few weeks prior to Bathurst and felt that veteran Grice was the better choice to drive the final stint. While Percy wanted Grice as his co-driver, team owner Walkinshaw was initially against the idea due to memories of Grice giving the TWR Rovers hell during the 1986 ETCC and only reluctantly let Percy chose his own co-driver. At the end of the 1991 Australian Touring Car season after two years in charge of the Holden Racing Team, Percy and his wife returned to England. After a relatively quiet year in which he did little racing, Percy returned to Australia and the HRT in 1992 to drive the new 1993 spec Holden VP Commodore alongside Grice at both the Sandown 500 and the Bathurst 1000, finishing 5th outright and first in Class C for the new spec cars at Bathurst.

Percy continued to contest the Australian endurance events, driving for the Holden Racing Team in 1993, Wayne Gardner Racing in 1994 and 1995, and John Faulkner Racing in 1997.

After 1991 he drove in many series around the world. He contested the 1993 British Touring Car Championship season in a Nissan Primera. While acting as team manager in the Mazda entry for the 1994 BTCC, and chief tester and latterly team manager for Harrier between 1995 and 1997, as a driver he took the Jaguar XJ220's first race win.

In the late 1990s he became active on the historic motorsport stage, often driving his Jaguar D-type XKD 505 in historic sports car races. In 2002, driving XKD 505, he won all four races at the Le Mans Classic meeting.

Accident 
In the summer of 2003, Percy suffered a serious accident in his garden. He was taken to hospital, where a medical error led to him being paralysed from the waist down. He sued the West Dorset General Hospital National Health Service Trust and received an out of court settlement of £1.55 million in April 2008. No longer able to compete, he is still a regular visitor to motor racing events around Britain.

Career results
Results sourced from Driver Database.

Complete British Saloon / Touring Car Championship results
(key) (Races in bold indicate pole position – 1973–1990 in class) (Races in italics indicate fastest lap – 1 point awarded ?–1989 in class)

† Events with 2 races staged for the different classes.

‡ Endurance driver.

Complete European Touring Car Championship results
(key) (Races in bold indicate pole position) (Races in italics indicate fastest lap)

Complete World Touring Car Championship results
(key) (Races in bold indicate pole position) (Races in italics indicate fastest lap)

Complete Asia-Pacific Touring Car Championship results
(key) (Races in bold indicate pole position) (Races in italics indicate fastest lap)

Complete Australian Touring Car Championship results
(key) (Races in bold indicate pole position) (Races in italics indicate fastest lap)

Complete 24 Hours of Le Mans results

Complete Spa 24 Hour results

Complete Bathurst 1000 results

References

External links

 Win Percy's Get Well Soon page
 Interview with Win Percy at Gear Wheels online.
 ETCC results and photos.

Living people
1943 births
English racing drivers
British Touring Car Championship drivers
British Touring Car Championship Champions
Australian Touring Car Championship drivers
Holden people
Bathurst 1000 winners
24 Hours of Le Mans drivers
Supercars Championship drivers
World Sportscar Championship drivers
24 Hours of Spa drivers
European Touring Car Championship drivers
Australian Endurance Championship drivers
Nismo drivers
Jaguar Racing drivers
Ecurie Ecosse drivers